CBJ-FM is a French-language Canadian radio station located in Saguenay, Quebec.

Owned and operated by the government-owned Canadian Broadcasting Corporation (French : Société Radio-Canada), it broadcasts on 93.7 MHz with an effective radiated power of 50,000 watts (class B) using an omnidirectional antenna.

The station has an ad-free news/talk format and is part of the Ici Radio-Canada Première network, which operates across Canada.

The station originated in 1933 as CRCS, owned and operated by the CRBC and based in Chicoutimi (which became part of Saguenay in 2002). It became CBJ when the CRBC became the CBC. Originally located on 1580 kHz, the station moved to FM in 1999. The AM signal was a 50,000-watt clear channel station from 1977 onward, and was well known as an extremely reliable DX signal at night. It was often used by people who wanted to receive Première Chaîne when they were travelling just about anywhere in the eastern half of North America. The frequency has been reactivated, CKDO, Oshawa (10,000 watts).

The station's current local programs are Y'a des matins, in the morning from 6:00 a.m. to 9:00 a.m., and Style libre in the afternoon from 3:30 p.m. to 6:00 p.m. The Saturday morning program, Samedi et rien d'autre, originates from CBF-FM Montreal. On public holidays, its local programs are replaced with local shows airing provincewide produced by different outlets in turn (except Montreal and Quebec City).

Transmitters

Technical information

Because of deficiencies with the main FM signal which did not exist when the station was on AM, in the 2000s CBJ-FM operated a relay, CBJ-FM-6, to serve nearby La Baie, now part of Saguenay. That relay was one of the few co-channel relays used in Canada, meaning that it had also operated on 93.7 MHz; this solution was chosen to permit people to listen to the station in their cars continuously between Chicoutimi and La Baie without having to switch to a new frequency, de facto extending the main signal of CBJ-FM. CBJ-FM-6 used a directional antenna with an average effective radiated power of 16 watts and a peak effective radiated power of 86 watts (class A1). On May 22, 2014, the CRTC approved the CBC's application to change the FM frequency of CBJ-FM-6 La Baie from 93.7 MHz to 102.1 MHz and to increase the maximum ERP from 85.7 to 544 watts.  A technical change for CBJ-FM-6 was approved on September 13, 2016 to increase the average effective radiated power (ERP) from 98 to 194 watts (maximum ERP increasing from 544 to 1,138 watts) and by decreasing the effective height of antenna above average terrain from 32.1 to 25.8 metres (105' to 85'). 

On May 22, 1984, the CRTC approved the CBC's application to add low-power AM transmitters at Petit-Saguenay on 1140 kHz (CBJ-5)  and L'Anse-Saint-Jean on 990 kHz (CBJ-4) both with the power of 40 watts.   On April 29, 2003, the CBC received approval from the CRTC to convert CBJ-4 L'Anse-Saint-Jean from the AM band (990 kHz) to the FM band at 101.9 MHz.  The new transmitter CBJ-FM-4 would replace the AM transmitters CBJ-4 L'Anse-Saint-Jean and CBJ-5 Petit-Saguenay.

On August 27, 2020, the CRTC approved the CBC's application to add a new FM transmitter at Petit-Saguenay. The new transmitter will operate at 101.3 MHz (channel 267A1) with an effective radiated power of 250 watts (non-directional antenna with an effective height of the antenna above average terrain of -196.4 metres; 645'). The call sign will be CBJ-FM-5.  

CBJ-2 operating at 1140 kHz in Chapais, Quebec is the last remaining AM transmitter to rebroadcast CBJ-FM. The Chapais transmitter may no longer be needed after the CBC received CRTC approval to increase the power of CBJ-FM-1 Chibougamau from 420 to 30,682 watts, increasing the average ERP from 420 watts to 12,075 watts, replacing the existing non-directional antenna with a new directional elliptically polarized antenna and by decreasing the effective height of the antenna above average terrain from 110.0 to 108.5 metres and changing the transmitter class from A to B.

References

External links
 Ici Radio-Canada Première
 

BJ
BJ
Canadian Radio Broadcasting Commission
BJ
Radio stations established in 1933
1933 establishments in Quebec